Baneh Khafrak (also known as Baneh Khafreh and Boneh Khafr) is a village in Khvajehei Rural District, Meymand District, Firuzabad County, Fars Province, Iran. At the 2006 census, its population was 457, in 97 families.

References 

Populated places in Firuzabad County